Madonna and Child with Two Saints is a tempera on panel tondo painting by Luca Signorelli, created c. 1492–1493, 112 cm in diameter. It is in the Galleria Corsini of the Palazzo Corsini in Florence, whilst a larger autograph replica known as the Baduel Tondo (c.1492-1500) is now in the Museo Bandini in Fiesole. To the left is Saint Jerome whilst to the right is Bernard of Clairvaux.

References

1490s paintings
Paintings of the Madonna and Child by Luca Signorelli
Paintings in Florence
Paintings of Jerome